Ferruccio Ghidini (born February 29, 1912 in Milan) was an Italian professional football player.

1912 births
Year of death missing
Italian footballers
Serie A players
Bologna F.C. 1909 players
Inter Milan players
U.S. Alessandria Calcio 1912 players
Association football midfielders